4-HO-MALT (4-hydroxy-N-methyl-N-allyltryptamine) is a tryptamine derivative which has been sold as a designer drug, first being detected in Slovenia in 2021.

See also
 4-HO-MiPT
 4-HO-McPT
 4-HO-MPT
 4-AcO-DALT
 5-MeO-MALT

References

Phenols
Tryptamines
Tertiary amines